Adriënne Herzog (born 30 September 1985, Amersfoort) is a Dutch middle- and long-distance runner. She has had most of her success in cross country running, being twice a bronze medallist at the European Cross Country Championships (2009 and 2012). She represented the Netherlands on the track at the 2006 European Athletics Championships and 2009 World Championships in Athletics, but failed to make the final on either occasion. She was a finalist, however, at the 2010 IAAF World Indoor Championships.

She is a seven-time Dutch national champion in cross country. She also won a bronze medal at the 2003 European Athletics Junior Championships. On the circuit, she won the 2009 Lotto Cross Cup Brussels.

Herzog was implicated in doping practices as part of investigations connected with Operación Galgo. Her coach at the time, Manuel Pascua Piqueras, was a central figure in the scandal. After being interrogated by the police, she was ultimately not charged of an offence after the evidence against her was destroyed. In 2013, Dutch magazine Vrij Nederland published a series of email excerpts which it claimed demonstrated Herzog obtaining performance-enhancing drugs during 2011 and 2012. Following this, her new coach Brad Hudson decided to cease working with Herzog, despite her claims that the magazine's assertions were untrue and no formal proceedings were brought against her. Herzog received a two-year doping ban after she gave a positive test in March 2014. She claimed that the positive test was a mistake and that she had never used banned substances.

National titles
Dutch Athletics Championships
1500 m: 2005, 2006, 2009
Dutch Cross Country Championships
Short course: 2004
Long course: 2005, 2006, 2007, 2008, 2011, 2012

International competitions

See also
List of doping cases in athletics

References

External links 

Official website

1985 births
Living people
Dutch female long-distance runners
Dutch female middle-distance runners
Sportspeople from Amersfoort
World Athletics Championships athletes for the Netherlands
Doping cases in athletics
Dutch sportspeople in doping cases
20th-century Dutch women
21st-century Dutch women